Richard O. Marshall is best known for being the first person to create High Fructose Corn Syrup along with his partner Earl R. Kooi in 1957. They first discovered how to use the glucose isomerase enzyme to convert glucose to fructose while working at the Corn Products Company. They patented the process in 1960.

See also
High-maltose corn syrup
High fructose corn syrup and health

Further reading

References

External links
 Sugar, The Bitter Truth
 Not only Sugar is Sweet, article in FDA Consumer published in 1991

Year of birth missing
Possibly living people
20th-century American inventors
American patent holders
Corn-based sweeteners
Sugar substitutes